A Critical Introduction to Phonology: Functional and Usage-Based Perspectives is a 2006 book by Daniel Silverman designed for an introductory course in phonology.

Reception
The book was reviewed by Marc Pierce, Stephanie Clair, Ewan Dunbar and William J. Idsardi.

References

External links
A Critical Introduction to Phonology

2006 non-fiction books
Phonology books
Linguistics textbooks
Continuum International Publishing Group books